Philip Delesalle (born 18 July 1958) is a Canadian gymnast. He competed in seven events at the 1976 Summer Olympics and won golds in all-around and team gymnastics at the 1978 Commonwealth Games.

References

External links
 

1958 births
Living people
Canadian male artistic gymnasts
Olympic gymnasts of Canada
Gymnasts at the 1976 Summer Olympics
Sportspeople from Victoria, British Columbia
Commonwealth Games medallists in gymnastics
Commonwealth Games gold medallists for Canada
Gymnasts at the 1978 Commonwealth Games
20th-century Canadian people
21st-century Canadian people
Medallists at the 1978 Commonwealth Games